A by-election was held in the Dáil Éireann Limerick East constituency in Ireland on 11 March 1998. It followed the death of Labour Party Teachta Dála (TD) Jim Kemmy on 25 September 1997.

The election was won by Limerick City Councillor Jan O'Sullivan of the Labour Party.

Among the candidates were Senator and Limerick County Councillor Mary Jackman, Limerick County Councillor Tim O'Malley, Limerick City Councillor John Ryan, Limerick City Councillor John Gilligan

On the same day, a by-election took place in Dublin North, both were the final occasions which Democratic Left contested by-elections.

Result

See also
List of Dáil by-elections
Dáil constituencies

References

External links
https://electionsireland.org/result.cfm?election=1997B&cons=159&ref=116
http://irelandelection.com/election.php?elecid=138&electype=2&constitid=94

1998 in Irish politics
1998 elections in the Republic of Ireland
28th Dáil
By-elections in the Republic of Ireland
Elections in County Limerick
March 1998 events in Europe